Mikhaylovka is a rural locality (a selo) and the administrative centre of Mikhaylovsky Selsoviet, Bizhbulyaksky District, Bashkortostan, Russia. The population was 1,172 as of 2010. There are 19 streets.

Geography 
Mikhaylovka is located 34 km north of Bizhbulyak (the district's administrative centre) by road. Ignashkino is the nearest rural locality.

References 

Rural localities in Bizhbulyaksky District